Özgur Baris Akan is a Professor with the Department of Electrical and Electronics Engineering and the Director of Next-generation and Wireless Communications Laboratory (NWCL) at the University of Cambridge and Koç University in Istanbul, Turkey. He was named Fellow of the Institute of Electrical and Electronics Engineers (IEEE) in 2016 for contributions to wireless sensor networks. Since the same year, he is also a fellow of the Vehicular Technology Society.

Early life and education
Akan was born in Ankara, Turkey. He attended Ankara Science High School, and after graduation from it, went to study in Bilkent University. After obtaining B.Sc. in electrical and electronics engineering from Bilkent in June 1999, he studied for an M.Sc. degree at Middle East Technical University, where in January 2002 he graduated with it in the same field. Akan received the Ph.D. degree in electrical and computer engineering in 2004, after studying at the Broadband and Wireless Networking Laboratory at Georgia Tech under the supervision of Ian Akyildiz. Following graduation, he joined the Department of Electrical and Electronics Engineering at the Middle East Technical University, serving there until August 2010. From January 2013 to May 2016, Akan served as associate and then as director of Graduate School of Sciences and Engineering.

References

External links

20th-century births
Living people
Turkish computer scientists
Turkish electrical engineers
Bilkent University alumni
Middle East Technical University alumni
Academics of the University of Cambridge
Academic staff of Koç University
Fellow Members of the IEEE
People from Ankara
Year of birth missing (living people)
Information theorists
Telecommunications engineers
Deans (academic)
Turkish engineering academics
Georgia Tech alumni